Tomoji is a masculine Japanese given name.

Possible writings
Tomoji can be written using different combinations of kanji characters. Some examples:

友二, "friend, two"
友次, "friend, next"
友児, "friend, child"
友治, "friend, manage/cure"
友爾, "friend, you"
友慈, "friend, mercy"
知二, "know, two"
知次, "know, next"
知児, "know, child"
知治, "know, manage/cure"
知爾, "know, you"
知慈, "know, mercy"
智二, "intellect, two"
智次, "intellect, next"
智児, "intellect, child"
智治, "intellect, manage/cure"
共二, "together, two"
共次, "together, next"
朋二, "companion, two"
朋次, "companion, next"
朝二, "morning/dynasty, two"
朝次, "morning/dynasty, next"
朝児, "morning/dynasty, child"
朝治, "morning/dynasty, manage/cure"

The name can also be written in hiragana ともじ or katakana トモジ.

Notable people with the name
, Japanese writer
, Japanese footballer
, Japanese politician
, Japanese poet and writer
, Japanese supercentenarian

Japanese masculine given names